Hyloxalus ruizi is a species of frogs in the family Dendrobatidae. It is endemic to Colombia and only known from the Eastern Ranges of the Colombian Andes, in the Cundinamarca Department.
Its natural habitats are cloud forests. It occurs on the forest floor and along streams. It is threatened by habitat loss (deforestation for the planting of crops and cattle grazing).

References

ruizi
Amphibians of the Andes
Amphibians of Colombia
Endemic fauna of Colombia
Amphibians described in 1982
Taxonomy articles created by Polbot